Élahé, also known by the names Malipahpan and Maripahpan, is a Wayana village on the Tampok River in French Guiana. A minority of Teko also live in the village.

Education 
A primary school opened in Élahé in 1985.

Geography 

Notes

References 

Indigenous villages in French Guiana
Maripasoula
Villages in French Guiana